Tabitha Smith is a superhero appearing in American comic books published by Marvel Comics, commonly in association with The X-Men and related titles. Created by Jim Shooter and Al Milgrom, the character first appeared in Secret Wars II #5 (Nov. 1985). She then appeared as a member of X-Force and later as a member of Nextwave. 

Tabitha is mentally able to create variably-sized yellow orbs of pure energy that explode with concussive and destructive force. Since her first appearance, she has used a number of different codenames, including Time Bomb, Boom-Boom, Boomer, and Meltdown.

Publication history
Created by Jim Shooter and Al Milgrom, the character first appeared in Secret Wars II #5 (Nov. 1985), in which she and the Beyonder are the primary characters. She next appears as a main character in the 1987 limited series Fallen Angels. This led to her becoming a supporting character in the X-Factor series beginning with issue #11, which then led to a co-star role in the X-Terminators limited series.  Following this series, she appeared in The New Mutants, initially guest-starring as a member of the X-Terminators, and eventually becoming a member of the titular group. The team then became X-Force and she remained a member of the team for most of the X-Force series. Sometime later, she appears as a member of Nextwave throughout the Nextwave series. Writer Warren Ellis said that he picked Boom-Boom to be in Nextwave because Boom-Boom is his favorite super hero name in the history of comics for its sheer oddness and silliness, and he loved it when she was in Uncanny X-Men when Joe Madureira was the artist.

Despite the appearance of Nextwave characters in other Marvel titles, in 2006 Editor-in-Chief Joe Quesada stated that Nextwave's setting was in a universe separate from the main Marvel continuity. However, Official Handbook of the Marvel Universe and Civil War: Battle Damage Report consistently place Nextwave's activities in mainstream continuity. To further complicate matters, Nextwave's entry in Civil War: Battle Damage Report states: "Recent intelligence suggests some or all Nextwave members unknowingly had their memories and/or personalities altered by their new employers (H.A.T.E.)."

Fictional character biography

Early life
Tabitha Smith was born in Roanoke, Virginia and is depicted as a rebellious but normal teenager, and the daughter of divorced parents, in her first appearance. Her mutant powers manifest at age 13, and her parents immediately show their disgust, with her father even beating her. Running away from home, she gives herself the alias "Time Bomb" and meets the cosmic entity known as the Beyonder. He brings her to Charles Xavier, headmaster of the School for Gifted Youngsters, who ignores her to combat the Beyonder. Before she can commit suicide over this second rejection, the Beyonder stops her, taking her with him on his cosmic trip. The Beyonder confronts the Celestials, and at her behest, returns Tabitha to Earth. She helps the Avengers ambush the Beyonder and leaves the battlefield when she learns that the Beyonder felt betrayed by the actions of "his only friend."

Fallen Angels and X-Terminators
Living on the streets, Tabitha becomes involved with Maurice "Tiger" Antonini and, after he threatens her and murders her friend Gina, she uses her powers to kill him. Then, the villain known as the Vanisher recruits her for his band of thieves, called the Fallen Angels, and she officially takes on the codename "Boom-Boom." She eventually betrays the Vanisher, calling in the help of X-Factor, with whom she stays afterward. Tabitha's former teammate in the Fallen Angels, the alien Ariel, kidnaps the Angels and takes them to her home where they are experimented on by her planet's scientists. Ultimately, she can't go through with the plan and helps them escape. The Angels return to Earth and go their separate ways. Tabitha is kidnapped by the Right, an anti-mutant organization. Tabitha, X-Factor, and other mutants regain their freedom.

When X-Factor wards Artie Maddicks and Leech are kidnapped by N'astirh's demons, Tabitha joins her fellow X-Factor trainees in a mission to rescue them. Taking the situation less seriously than the others, Tabitha is quick to pronounce the five of them "the newest super-mutant team in town" and pick out costumes for them all. They adopt the name X-Terminators.

New Mutants
Following two successful team-ups with the New Mutants, Tabitha and some members of the X-Terminators, Rusty, Skids, and Rictor, join the group. During her time with the New Mutants, Tabitha falls in love with her teammate, Cannonball. When the team is transported to the mythical realm of Asgard, it is partially through Tabitha that the team is able to foil a plot to kill Odin. There she becomes close friends with the wolf-prince Hrimhari. They encounter the man known as Cable, and when he starts to mentor the team, Tabitha gains greater control of her powers. Tabitha is captured by Stryfe and the Mutant Liberation Front but is rescued.

During "The X-Tinction Agenda" crossover, in which the country of Genosha attacks mutants in the United States, the Genoshan Magistrates kidnap Boom-Boom and her teammates Rictor, Wolfsbane, and Warlock, transporting them to Genosha. The incident receives international coverage, and Tabitha's father is interviewed, still voicing his disgust for his daughter. Although stripped of their powers, she and Rictor escape. Warlock does not survive. On the streets of Genosha, Rictor and Tabitha meet Jubilee, and Tabitha and Jubilee's similar attitudes clash. They eventually make their way to the Genoshan citadel, where the other X-Teams gather to defeat Cameron Hodge, who orchestrated the entire ordeal. Once returned to the United States, Tabitha spreads the ashes of her friend Warlock over the grave of his best friend Doug Ramsey.

X-Force
The New Mutants team, under the continued tutelage of Cable, is reformed into X-Force. The team undergoes a revamp, employing new, more aggressive methods. During this time, Tabitha acts on her crush on Cannonball, and the two have a relationship. Although questioning the team's new methods, Tabitha sticks with the team, rechristening herself "Boomer." She battles the Brotherhood of Evil Mutants alongside her new team in one of their early missions.

Following an attempted murder of Professor X, mutual distrust places X-Force in conflict with the X-Men and X-Factor, and X-Force is apprehended. Cannonball arranges for the team to be temporarily released so that they can help take down their arch-enemies, the Mutant Liberation Front. Among the MLF are two of Boomer's former teammates in both the X-Terminators and New Mutants, Rusty and Skids, who breaks Boomer's jaw. After X-Force's names are cleared, Tabitha is confronted by Cannonball's ex-girlfriend Lila Cheney, who gives the couple her blessing. Showing how serious he is, Cannonball takes Tabitha along for a vacation on his family's farm. During the stay, they are confronted by the Gamesmaster and the Upstarts, and team up with the New Warriors to defeat them.

Eventually, the team's headquarters is blown up twice, and without a home, the team moves back into Xavier's mansion. Shortly after, Cannonball graduates into becoming an X-Men member, and their relationship waters down. Seeking comfort, Tabitha spends most of her time caring for the lobotomized Sabretooth, also confiding in him. Her teammates attempt an unsuccessful intervention.

Sabretooth reveals that he is faking the ordeal however, and fully healed, escapes by deceiving Tabitha into destroying his bonds. In his escape, he eviscerates the X-Man Psylocke, who barely survives her wounds.

In an effort to deal with the guilt from this incident, Tabitha travels home to visit her father. The two reconcile, but in a fight with Sebastian Shaw and Holocaust, her father is critically injured. With more guilt on her mind, Tabitha underwent a radical change, renaming herself "Meltdown," designing a new costume and gaining better control of her powers along with a more brash and assertive attitude. This new attitude is displayed by Meltdown when she fights the Blob, threatening to kill him, and eventually having two time-bombs explode near his eardrums.

With Cannonball spending his time with the X-Men, Tabitha grows closer to Sunspot and they begin a short-lived fling. Cannonball finds out and is initially angry but reconciles with both his friends, rejoining X-Force in the process. After an incident in which the High Evolutionary shut off all mutant powers, Tabitha and Cannonball come close to rekindling their relationship.

Peter Wisdom
In the meantime, the sudden power loss really hit home for Cannonball, as to just how little they had been doing lately to help mutant-kind. He got back in touch with Pete Wisdom, and together they devised a plan for reactivating X-Force as a covert strike team. Meltdown, along with Warpath and Bedlam, agreed to enter into this new arrangement, and they took up residence in an abandoned Nevada Hulkbuster base for extensive retraining for martial combat and the use of their powers. In particular, Tabitha learned how to direct the explosive force of her power into streams of guided energy, and was also heavily trained in computer hacking and manipulating digital information. The revamped X-Force fought the shadow wars that other people couldn't even see, against the likes of meat-spore storm-troopers, mutagenic bioreactors, and assassins who carried the mutant gene for murder. After she almost lost Sam to that last threat, Meltdown confessed she couldn't bear to see him die, and the two of them became lovers again. While most of their missions were successful, they weren't without their share of troubles - Wisdom was apparently killed on their first mission back in San Francisco since leaving, and on two separate occasions their enemies tried to kill them in massive explosions.

The team's undercover status turned out to be a weakness, though, for some new organization consisting of mutants that wanted to get rich and famous thought the name was up for grabs. After buying legal rights to use "X-Force" as their name, this group went public and soon became popular. When the original X-Force learned of this, they came out of hiding and confronted the new guys about the name and violating the original concept behind the team, it was already too late. Apparently, the original X-Force disbanded after this, retreating from their recent hardcore offensive stance on mutant issues. Sam and Tabitha also went their separate ways.

Weapon X and the X-Force mini
When Cable discovers hints regarding the existence of a revamped Weapon X program, one designed to use mutants to hunt down and intern other mutants, he creates an organization to investigate the program and the existence of its internment camp, Neverland. He dubs the organization the Underground and invites Meltdown to join his elite group. Ultimately, Cable's Underground group is joined by Weapon X agent Brent Jackson, who hopes to stage a coup against the project's Director and has formed his own resistance group with fellow agents Washout, Marrow, Wild Child, and Sauron. Jackson betrays the Underground team however after the coup is successful and alters/wipes their memories of the events.

Sometime thereafter, Cable learns of another threat to mutant-kind, the voracious creatures known as the Skornn, a creature that was going to threaten Earth. He gathers and reunites X-Force to deal with them. Meltdown is among the former members he recruits. While both Cannonball and Sunspot are also involved in the conflict, Tabitha's feelings for either weren't brought up. However, she reveals to have learned a new trick with her mutant powers when she channeled one of her time bombs through Shatterstar's blade straight into the chest of a seemingly unbeatable opponent. After the Skornn was also defeated, some of X-Force remained together, assisting Cable on Providence, an island nation he created. Afterward, she helps them attack the headquarters of the Black Box, though the occupant turns out to be a robot. 

Tabitha is one of the few mutants who retain her powers after the events of M-Day.

Nextwave
Shortly afterward, after an initial period of wild arrogance, Tabitha mellows out and settles back into her earlier more bubbly personality, developing a tendency to use chat room-like shorthand when speaking out loud, such as "OMG," "ZOMG," and "OH NOES!"  She also begins to start saying "Tick, tick, tick-- BOOM!" when using her powers. Tabitha grows her hair long and eschewed her codename and re-appears as a founding member of Nextwave, a new off-beat and more than slightly satirical super-hero team featured in an eponymous comic book series created by Warren Ellis and Stuart Immonen. The Highest Anti-Terrorism Effort, or H.A.T.E. (a subsidiary of the Beyond Corporation©) formed the team. Tabitha Smith's new team includes other second-string characters taken from Marvel limbo, including Monica Rambeau (formerly Captain Marvel, the leader of the Avengers), Elsa Bloodstone, Aaron Stack, and a new character The Captain.

Everything seemed on the up and up until Tabitha began snooping around, and discovered the marketing plan of the Beyond Corporation, H.A.T.E.'s financial backers. It turned out that Beyond Corp evolved out of the former terrorist cell known as S.I.L.E.N.T., and was planning to use H.A.T.E. and Nextwave to further its own sinister agendas. Tabitha brought the files she stole to the squad leader, Pulsar, and Nextwave hijacked a Shockwave Rider transport ship and defected from H.A.T.E. Tabitha and the others fought against their former employers, and defended the country from the unusual WMDs unleashed by the Beyond Corporation on the general populace; the first biological weapon was revealed to be Fin Fang Foom, a giant lizard which clambered from underground and proceeded to wreck the building site.

After putting an end to the threat of Fin Fang Foom in Abscess, North Dakota, Nextwave moved on to Illinois. Tabitha manages to subdue Mac Mangel, a corrupt police officer who had been taken as a host by the Ultra Samurai Seed. The Ultra Samurai metallic shell disintegrates, leaving Mangel crushed. Upon learning that he was a police officer, Tabitha and Aaron began to beat Mangel before Rambeau intervened.

The team was later attacked by The New Paramounts, a team consisting of Not Brand Echh characters including Forbush Man, The Inedible Bulk and Charlie America. Forbush Man attempted to use his mind control powers on Tabitha, but was shocked to find they didn't work on her as she apparently has no mind. Tabitha subsequently killed Forbush Man, saving her teammates. When they awoke, she explained "The little guy did something to your heads. I gave him the explodo because I am clever." Not long after, they eventually exposed and destroyed the true mastermind behind S.I.L.E.N.T.

Manifest Destiny

Tabitha moves to San Francisco to help with the X-Men's new relocation plans, and resumes using the codename Boom-Boom. While shopping in San Francisco she confronts the mutant Nuwa. Forced by the Beast to confront Nuwa through research, instead of strength alone, she discovers - using a thinly veiled parody of MySpace and Facebook called FaceSpace - the true nature of Nuwa's sedation powers, then nullifies them by consuming large quantities of stimulants, namely the caffeine in an unspecified number of espressos.

Kidnapping, death and salvation
Tabitha is later kidnapped along with Surge and Hellion by the Leper Queen and her Sapien League. The Leper Queen attempts to inject her with a modified version of the Legacy Virus, a virus which had been cured years before that afflicted mostly mutants, when the members of X-Force arrive to try and save her, Surge and Hellion. After Cyclops refuses to wait long enough for Wolverine and Domino to kill the Leper Queen, they are sent through time to help Cable, leaving the Leper Queen and Tabitha all alone. The Leper Queen reveals to Tabitha that she had intended using X-Force to kill her, since Bastion will not let her commit suicide and that the plan was for Wolverine to kill her and rescue Tabby. The Leper Queen shoots Tabitha between the eyes, saying that X-Force "failed them both." After X-Force's mission in the future is complete, X-23 emerges from the timestream seconds before the Leper Queen is about to kill Tabitha and shoots her in the head. With the Leper Queen dead and Boom-Boom saved, X-23 collapses in exhaustion just as a team of H.A.M.M.E.R. agents storm the building, providing Tabitha with medical care while taking X-23 into custody. The agents are given the order to take a genetic sample from Tabitha and then kill her, but one agent plans to rape her before killing her. She is saved from death yet again by Warpath, who kills the agents before they are able to defile her and takes her to the X-Force safehouse to see if she remembers anything else about her kidnapping.

Utopia
Boom-Boom is later seen during the events of "Utopia," amongst the mutants assembled in Nightcrawler's chapel as they all prepare to abandon San Francisco for the base that the X-Club has raised from the bottom of the ocean. She is among the first group of mutants teleported by Pixie to the new base. Boom-Boom was also one of the X-Men who defeated the invading Predator Xs who attacked Utopia. Boom-Boom, Iceman, and Colossus teamed up to defeat the first Predator.

Cable and X-Force
Boom-Boom returns in the Marvel NOW! series Cable and X-Force, aiding her old X-Force teammate Domino in her infiltration of a S.W.O.R.D. base.

Tabitha later appears as a member of the Utopians alongside Elixir, Karma, Madison Jeffries, Masque, and Random.

Powers and abilities
Tabitha Smith possesses the ability to create variably-sized yellow orbs and spheres of pure plasma, fiery-like energy, which she calls her "time bombs." These "time bombs" explode with concussive force. She can produce marble-sized energized "bombs" which have little concussive impact and which she uses for playing pranks. She has produced "time bombs" ranging up to the size of beach balls, which are able to destroy durable objects, including a Predator X and a futuristic Nimrod. Tabitha can also control the amount of time before detonation. Finally, she can mentally muffle the sound of the detonation. Under the direction of Pete Wisdom she learns to focus her power as streams of concussive force.

Reception

Accolades 

 In 2014, Entertainment Weekly ranked Tabitha Smith 87th in their "Let's rank every X-Man ever" list.
 In 2018, CBR.com ranked Tabitha Smith 18th in their "X-Force: 20 Powerful Members Ranked From Weakest To Strongest" list.
 In 2020, Scary Mommy included Tabitha Smith in their "Looking For A Role Model? These 195+ Marvel Female Characters Are Truly Heroic" list.
 In 2021, Screen Rant included Tabitha Smith in their "10 Most Powerful Members Of The New Mutants" list.
 In 2022, CBR.com ranked Tabitha Smith 1st in their "10 Best X-Men Mutants Who Haven't Been In A Movie Yet" list, 9th in their "Every Member Of The New Mutants, Ranked By Growth" list and 9th in their "10 Marvel Mutants We Want To See In The MCU's Phase 5" list.

Other versions

House of M
Tabitha appears as a member of the NYPD strikeforce known as the Brotherhood. Posing as Karolina Dean, she attacked and defeated the Wolfpack.

Marvel Zombies
Tabitha is also shown in Marvel Zombies vs. The Army of Darkness #3 with her Nextwave team, all uninfected, to save Ash from a zombified Power Pack. The entire team is "humiliatingly and ruthlessly dispatched off panel" moments later.

Rahne of Terra
In the "heroic fantasy" universe visited by Wolfsbane and Wolverine in Rahne of Terra and Knight of Terra (though Tabitha does not appear in the latter in any form), Geshem is an otherdimensional realm of medieval magic. The land is ruled by Queen Rain, a counterpart of Wolfsbane, and that dimension's Tabitha is her most loyal and trusted maid. Rain confides in Tabitha with her deepest secrets.

X-Men: The End
In X-Men: The End, a series set ten to fifteen years in the future, Meltdown is once again a member of X-Force along with Warpath, Domino, Shatterstar, Feral, and Rictor when the team meets their end.  After their aircraft is shot out of the sky, (which X-Force barely survives), Meltdown is absorbed by the strange entity called Divinity, who uses Tabitha's powers against her teammates. Not much later, though, Divinity is killed by Apocalypse while Meltdown is still trapped inside him.

X-Force: Shatterstar
In the X-Force: Shatterstar miniseries, Tabitha is still known as Boomer and she is seen as a part of Cable's rebel forces against Spiral, in an alternate universe where Spiral has conquered and now rules Earth. On that Earth, Spiral has also killed most of that world's heroes and mutants. Together, the team eventually defeats Spiral. Tabitha also seems to have developed telepathic powers in this timeline.

In other media

Television
 Tabitha Smith makes a non-speaking appearance in the X-Men: The Animated Series episode "No Mutant is an Island" as a child orphan who, among others, Zebediah Killgrave attempts to take advantage of until they are rescued by Cyclops.
 Tabitha Smith / Boom-Boom appears in X-Men: Evolution, voiced by Megan Leitch. This version was forced by her father to commit crimes when she was younger until she becomes a student at the Xavier Institute and joins the X-Men's junior team, the New Mutants. However, her lack of discipline and mischievousness leads to her temporarily moving in with the Brotherhood of Bayville before Mystique evicts her. Additionally, Boom-Boom is best friends with fellow New Mutant Magma and displays a romantic interest in Nightcrawler.
 Tabitha Smith / Boom-Boom appears in the Wolverine and the X-Men episode "Hindsight, Part 1", voiced by Jennifer Hale.

Video games
Tabitha Smith appears in Marvel Heroes, voiced by Kari Wahlgren.

Miscellaneous
Tabitha Smith appears in the Wolverine versus Sabretooth motion comic, voiced by Kazumi Evans.

Merchandise
 Tabitha Smith / Boom-Boom received a figure in HeroClix's "Xplosion" series.
 Tabitha Smith / Boom-Boom, based on her Nextwave appearance, received a figure in HeroClix's Giant Size X-Men set.
 Tabitha Smith / Boom-Boom received a figure in HeroClix's "Deadpool and X-Force" box set.
 Tabitha Smith, based on her 1990s X-Force appearance, received a figure in the Marvel Minimates line.
 Tabitha Smith / Boom-Boom received a figure in the Marvel Legends toyline.

References

External links
 Boom-Boom
 UncannyXmen.net Spotlight On Meltdown
 Boom-Boom X-Men Evolution

Characters created by Al Milgrom
Characters created by Jim Shooter
Comics characters introduced in 1985
Fictional characters from Virginia
Fictional characters with energy-manipulation abilities
Marvel Comics female superheroes
Marvel Comics martial artists
Marvel Comics mutants
New Mutants
X-Factor (comics)